Jacqueline Ntuyabaliwe Mengi is a Tanzanian award-winning furniture designer and chairman of Amorette Ltd a furniture design and manufacturing company. Jacqueline is also the founder and chairman of Dr Ntuyabaliwe Foundation a charity organization which provides libraries and books to local primary schools.

Career

Music career
She began her career as a musician in 1997 with a Tanzanian band the Tanzanites. She performed as one of the lead vocalists for three years. In 2004 she released her first solo album with a hit single Nalia kwa Furaha. Three years later she released another album called Crazy over You which was also the name of the first hit single for that album.

Miss Tanzania 2000
In 2000, she won the Miss Tanzania and represented the country in Miss World.

Interior Design, Amorrete Ltd, Molocaho Furniture
After almost ten years in the music industry she switched careers to interior design. In 2013 she registered her own interior design company, Amorrete Ltd.

In 2016  Jacqueline launched MOLOCAHO by Amorette, an award-winning furniture brand designed and manufactured by her company Amorette.

Personal life

Jacqueline was married to Reginald Mengi, a business man and media tycoon. They have twin sons together.

Awards and nominations

2018
Stevie International Awards-Entrepreneur of the Year- Manufacturing

References

External links 

 
 
 

Furniture designers
Interior designers
Miss World 2000 delegates
Tanzanian beauty pageant winners
20th-century Tanzanian women singers
Living people
1978 births
21st-century Tanzanian women singers
 Swahili-language singers
 Tanzanian musicians